Kotthu is a 2022 Indian Malayalam-language political thriller film directed by Sibi Malayil and written by Hemanth Kumar. It was produced by Ranjith and P. M. Sasidharan. The film stars Asif Ali, Nikhila Vimal, Roshan Mathew, Ranjith and Sreelakshmi in important roles. Jakes Bejoy composed the original score, while Kailas Menon composed the original songs. It also marks the comeback of Sibi Malayil after 7 years. The film received mixed reviews and became a box office average hit.

Plot
Inspired from many real life incidents, the film tells the life of political party workers from Northern Kerala and their bloodshed to reinvigorate the rebellious nature of the parties and the untouchable party worker status at the cost of lives.

Cast
Asif Ali as Shanavas / Shanu, a member of the political party KCP(M)
Nikhila Vimal as Hizana, Shanu's wife
Roshan Mathew as Sumesh Chandran, Shanu's friend and party member
Ranjith as Sadhanandan, the party secretary
Sreelakshmi as Ammini, Sumesh's mother
Vijilesh Karayad as Ajith, Shanu's friend 
Atul Ram Kumar as Sreejith, Shanu's friend
Sudev Nair as A.S.P Niteesh Mitra
Sreejith Ravi as M. N. Nagendran
Raghunath Paleri as Hamsa, Hizana's father
Jitin Puthenchery as Ajmal, Hizana's brother 
Hakkim Shajahan as Yousaf
Kottayam Ramesh as Balan Master
Appunni Sasi as the police constable

Production
Principal photography of the film began on 10 October 2020 at Kozhikode following the COVID-19 protocols and safety measures. Kotthu is actor Asif Ali's fourth collaboration with director Sibi Malayil after Apoorvaragam, Violin and Unnam. The first schedule of the filming at Kozhikode was completed on 25 October 2020.

Release
The film was released in theatres on 16 September 2022.

References

External links
 

2022 films
2022 thriller drama films
Indian political thriller films
2020s political thriller films
2020s Malayalam-language films
Films directed by Sibi Malayil
Films scored by Kailas Menon
Films shot in Kozhikode
Films shot in Kannur